White pine sawfly may refer to two pine sawfly species, whose larvae feed on the white pine:

 Diprion similis
 Neodiprion pinetum

Animal common name disambiguation pages